Zagazig Stadium is a multi-purpose stadium in Zagazig, Egypt. It is currently used mostly for football matches and hosts the home games of Sharkia SC. The stadium holds 20,000 people.

References

Zagazig
Populated places in Sharqia Governorate